Chérif Hadjar (born 20 February 1965) is an Algerian football manager.

References

1967 births
Living people
Algerian football managers
CR Témouchent managers
JS Saoura managers
MC Saïda managers
Olympique de Médéa managers
MC El Eulma managers
CRB Aïn Fakroun managers
US Biskra managers
GC Mascara managers
AS Aïn M'lila managers
RC Relizane managers
USM El Harrach managers
JSM Skikda managers
Algerian Ligue Professionnelle 1 managers
21st-century Algerian people